{{Infobox university
|image_name        = Bangabasi Morning College - Logo.png
|image_size        = 150px
|name              = Bangabasi Morning College
|motto             = प्रणिप्रातेन परिप्रशनेन सेवयाBhagvad Gita''(Earn Education & Serve the Humanitarian) 
|established       =  
|type              = Public
|principal         = Dr. Amitava Dutta
|vice_chancellor   = 
|city              = Kolkata
|state             = West Bengal
|country           = India
|undergrad         = 3000+
|postgrad          = 20+
|campus            = Urban; 2 campuses 
|free_label        = Recognition 
|free              = NAAC A Level
|website           = www.bangabasimorning.edu.in
}}Bangabasi Morning College is an undergraduate college affiliated with the University of Calcutta. It is located at Sealdah in the heart of the city of Kolkata. It has a very large auditorium named as P.K. Bose Memorial Hall.

Accreditation
Bangabasi Morning College has been Re-Accredited with Grade "A" by NAAC in December 2016.

Cultural Programmes
College has many cultural programme including the regional cultural programme of West Bengal, main programme which are organized by the students are:

Rabindra Jayanti on 9 May
Netaji birthday on 23 Jan
Independence Day on 15 Aug
Founders Day on 27 Sept
Saraswati Puja 
Bengali New Year on 15 Apr
Republic Day on 26 Jan

Every year the college publishes an Annual Magazine enriched with contribution from member of the staff and the students on the various subjects. It encourages the students to contribute their own article for publication. The magazine helps to kindle the creative talents of the students.

Annual Social Day
Annual social day is celebrated every year in college campus. Every year a Freshers welcome party is celebrated to welcome the new admitted students. In 2013 an inter-college quiz competition was organized in which a student named ABHISHEK TIWARI got the 1st prize. Every year the college organizes a blood donation camp to donate the blood to the NGO'S and related charitable trust.

Faculty
 History: Dr. Sandeep Sinha (Ph.D., M.A.)
 Anthropology: Dr. P. Sarkar (M.Sc., Ph.D., Assistant Professor)
 Hindi: Dr. Ausotosh Kumar (M.A., Ph.D., Assistant Professor)
 Zoology: Dr. Sreejata Biswas (M.Sc., Ph.D., B.Ed., Assistant Professor)
 Botany: Dr. Shyamali Mazumdar (M.Sc., L.L.B., Ph.D., Associate Professor)
 Bengali: Dr.Madan Chandra (M.A., M.Phil, Pd.D., Assistant Professor)
 Chemistry: Dr. Amitabh Dutta (M.sc., Ph.D., Assistant Professor)
 Computer Science:Sri Subhrat Dinda, M.C.A., M.Tech.
 Mathematics: Dr.Sujata Sinha (M.A., Ph.D., Assistant Professor)
 Philosophy:Smt Sukla Sarkar (M.A., Assistant Professor)
 Physics: Dr. Mukul Mitra (M.Sc., PhD., Associate Professor)
 Librarian: Smt Shila Ghosh (M.A., B.Lib., I.Sc)

Courses
Presently the college offers honours degree courses in the following:

 Accounting & Finance
 Bengali
 Biological Science
 Botany
 Computer Science
 Economics
 English
 Mathematics
 Physics
 Political Science
 Chemistry

It is one of the few centers of study of Urdu at the undergraduate level, and grants degrees including B.Sc., B.Com., and Bachelor of Arts.

 Undergraduate courses 

 B.SC. (PURE) Honours : Physics, Chemistry, Mathematics, Computer ScienceGeneral : Physics, Mathematics, Chemistry, Computer Science

 B.SC.(BIO) Honours : Botany, Zoology, AnthropologyGeneral : Zoology, Botany, Chemistry

 B.A Honours : Bengali, English, Political Science, HindiGeneral : Elective Bengali, Elective English, Elective Hindi, Elective Urdu, Political Science, History, Philosophy, Economics, Geography

 B.COM Honours : Accounting & FinanceGeneral :''' All compulsory subjects under B.Com Syllabus

Facility
The college has large size campus in area and it gives all the facility to the students that a college must have. The main facility provided by the college are:

Common Room (university)
Students Union Room
Library
Canteen
Computer Lab
Laboratories for (Physics, Chemistry, Zoology, Botany, Anthropology, Computer Sc)
College Auditorium
Sports Club
N.C.C. Room

Alumni
 Jatindra Nath Das
 Netaji civil activist 
 Sanjib Sarkar - Music director

See also
Bangabasi College
Bangabasi Evening College

References

External links
  

1965 establishments in West Bengal
University of Calcutta affiliates
Educational institutions established in 1965
Universities and colleges in Kolkata